On 24 June 1972, in the rural townland of Crabarkey near Dungiven, the Provisional IRA detonated an improvised land mine, killing three British Army soldiers in a Land Rover. It was one of many such attacks by the IRA in the 1970s.

Attack
The attack occurred in the early morning of 24 June 1972 at Crabarkey, on the main A6 Belfast to Derry road just outside Dungiven. An army Land Rover was escorting a lorry that was transporting a crippled helicopter, damaged in a crash landing, toward RAF Aldergrove in County Antrim. IRA volunteers hiding about 200 yards away detonated the land mine by command wire as the convoy passed, catching seven soldiers in the blast, killing three and injuring four. Immediately after the blast, an IRA unit opened fire on the lorry that had been following the Land Rover, wounding three more soldiers including a helicopter pilot. The three soldiers killed in the blast were Lance-Corporal David Moon (24) of No. 664 Squadron AAC,  Private Christopher Stevenson (24) of the Parachute Regiment and Sergeant Stuart Reid (28) of the Royal Electrical and Mechanical Engineers.

Aftermath
Malachy Bernard O'Kane, a farmer, was convicted of the attack and was ordered to serve at least 25 years of a life term. A year after he was sentenced, his mother and his two brothers attempted to help him escape from Magilligan Prison. One brother was to disguise himself as Malachy and switch places. All three were caught and sentenced to 18 months imprisonment, the mother's sentence being suspended. O'Kane was given a five-year sentence, to run concurrently with his life term. O'Kane was later released from prison and unsuccessfully ran as a Sinn Féin candidate in the 1997 UK general election but was successful in gaining a seat on Limavady Council the same year in the 1997 local election.

See also
Forkhill beer keg bombing
Warrenpoint ambush
Dungannon land mine attack
Altnaveigh landmine attack

References

1972 in Northern Ireland
1970s in County Londonderry
Explosions in 1972
Explosions in County Londonderry
June 1972 events in Europe
Terrorist incidents in County Londonderry
Terrorist incidents in the United Kingdom in 1972
1972 crimes in Ireland
1970s murders in Northern Ireland
The Troubles in County Londonderry
Provisional Irish Republican Army actions
Conflicts in 1979
British Army in Operation Banner
Parachute Regiment (United Kingdom)
Improvised explosive device bombings in Northern Ireland
Military history of County Londonderry
Military actions and engagements during the Troubles (Northern Ireland)
20th century in County Londonderry
Ambushes in Northern Ireland